Kateretes pedicularius is a species of short-winged flower beetles native to Europe.

References

Kateretidae
Beetles described in 1758
Beetles of Europe
Taxa named by Carl Linnaeus